Hasnain Mohamed Murji (born 24 October 1966) is a Tanzanian CCM politician and Member of Parliament for Mtwara Town constituency since 2010. He was elected in the 2010 general elections with more than 56% of the popular vote.  He had also served the same constituency during the term 2000–2005.

Early life
He was educated at Karume Primary School in Newala and at Mkonge Secondary School in Lindi for his ordinary level education.

Legislative career
He is a member of the Chama cha Mapinduzi political party and first served as the member of parliament for Mtwara Urban constituency during the term 2000–2005. He was succeeded in 2005 by Hon. Mohamedi Sinani, also from the Chama cha Mapinduzi party. In 2010 he was re-elected once again.

In January 2013, he supported Mtwara resident's protest against the construction of a 532 km gas pipeline to Dar es Salaam.

References

External links
Official blog

1966 births
Living people
Chama Cha Mapinduzi MPs
Tanzanian MPs 2000–2005
Tanzanian MPs 2010–2015
Tanzanian Ismailis
Mkonge Secondary School alumni
Tanzanian politicians of Indian descent